Jean Cassemiro Rosa (born 1 February 1990) is a triple jumper from Brazil. He competed at the 2015 World Championships in Beijing without qualifying for the final.

His personal best in the event is 16.80 metres (+1.3 m/s) set in São Bernardo do Campo in 2015.

Competition record

References

Living people
Place of birth missing (living people)
1990 births
Brazilian male triple jumpers
Pan American Games athletes for Brazil
Athletes (track and field) at the 2015 Pan American Games
World Athletics Championships athletes for Brazil
South American Games silver medalists for Brazil
South American Games medalists in athletics
Competitors at the 2010 South American Games
20th-century Brazilian people
21st-century Brazilian people